Saltillo may refer to one of the following:

Places

Belize
Saltillo, Belize

Mexico
Saltillo, Coahuila state capital
Saltillo, a town in Las Margaritas, Chiapas

United States
Saltillo, Indiana, a town
Saltillo, Mississippi, a town
Saltillo, Nebraska, unincorporated community
Saltillo, Ohio, a village
Saltillo, Pennsylvania, a borough
Saltillo, Tennessee, a town
Saltillo, Texas, an unincorporated community
Saltillo (Adjuntas), a barrio of Adjuntas, Puerto Rico
Saltillo, Arkansas, a town

Other uses
Saltillo (linguistics), a Mexican linguistics term
Saltillo affair, a scandal involving the Portugal national football team during the 1986 FIFA World Cup in Mexico
Saltillo tile, a terra-cotta tile originating in Saltillo, Mexico

Musicians
Menton J. Matthews III, an American multi-instrumentalist known by the stage name Saltillo